The Ohio Force are a professional American football team based in Canton, Ohio. The team is a member of the Major League Football (MLFB), a public traded professional football league, and plays its home games at Tom Benson Hall of Fame Stadium.

The Force are part of the league "Core Four" teams.  They are the first pro football team in Canton since the NFL former champions Canton Bulldogs.

History
On March 18, 2022, Major League Football launched a new website and revealed that there will be only four teams for the first season. On March 30 former Ohio Dominican head coach and former Ohio State assistant, Bill Conley, was announced as the league third HC. The league would later reveled he will coach the Ohio Force.

The Force started their training camp on July 21. One week later, the team was evicted from its hotel amid unpaid bills and reports of the league shutting down.

Staff

Players

References

American football teams in Ohio
Sports in Canton, Ohio